Goleh-ye Chah (also Romanized as Goleh-ye Chāh) is a village in Bandan Rural District, in the Central District of Nehbandan County, South Khorasan Province, Iran. At the 2006 census, its population was 107, in 21 families.

References 

Populated places in Nehbandan County